Kierkegaard Studies Yearbook is a peer-reviewed academic journal of philosophy covering scholarly examination of Søren Kierkegaard's thought and edited by Heiko Schulz, Jon Stewart, and Karl Verstrynge. The journal publishes in English, French, and German. The journal was established in 1996 and is published by Walter de Gruyter on behalf  of the International Kierkegaard Society.

See also 
 List of philosophy journals

External links 
 

Annual journals
Multilingual journals
Journals about philosophers
Publications established in 1996
Works about Søren Kierkegaard
De Gruyter academic journals
Continental philosophy literature